Feel the Steel is the debut studio album by American glam metal band Steel Panther. It was released first in Europe on June 8, 2009, on Universal Records. The tracks "Fat Girl", "Stripper Girl" and "Hell's on Fire" are re-recordings from the band's 2003 EP Hole Patrol (which was released under their old name Metal Shop) while "Death to All but Metal" is a re-recording from their 2004 contribution to the Metal Sludge compilation Hey That's What I Call Sludge! Vol. 1. Unlike the debut album and their Metal Sludge compilation tracks, Feel the Steel is composed entirely of songs, lacking any spoken word comedy skits present on earlier releases. The video for "Death to All but Metal" features comedian Sarah Silverman. The album debuted on #123 and peaked at #98 on the Billboard 200 chart and peaked at #1 on the Billboard Top Comedy Albums chart.

The album was released June 8, 2009, in the UK, October 6 in North America and December 11 in Australia.

Reception

Initial critical response to Feel the Steel was mixed. According to Metacritic, which assigns a normalized rating out of 100 to reviews from mainstream critics, the album has received a score of 57, based on four reviews. Negative reviews found the album unfunny by taking the jokes too far. Jason Lymangrover of Allmusic wrote that "Steel Panther's ability to create songs that sound like they came from 1987 is commendable. That's about as close to clever as it gets, though. As David St. Hubbins said, "It's such a fine line between stupid and clever," and Saenz's locker-room humor wears thin quickly." 

Sophie Bruce of the BBC stated "Quite simply, Feel the Steel is an utter feelgood masterpiece." The Independent wrote that "it's essentially Spinal Tap/Bad News brought forward five years to the coked-up cock-rock era, complete with titles such as 'Eatin' Ain't Cheatin' and dangerous levels of dumb-ass homophobia, sexism, racism and sizeism. The songs are at times terrifyingly authentic. Is it new? Don't be stupid. Is it funny? Hell yeah." NME placed the 2009 video for "Fat Girl", from this album, at number 41 on its list of the "50 worst music videos ever".

Track listing

Personnel
Michael Starr – lead vocals, backing vocals
Satchel – guitars, acoustic guitar, backing vocals
Lexxi Foxxx – bass, backing vocals
Stix Zadinia – drums, backing vocals

Additional musicians
Justin Hawkins – co-lead vocals (track 7)
M. Shadows – co-lead vocals (8)
Allison Robertson – lead guitar (7)
Scott Ian – rhythm guitar (2)
Ray Luzier - drums (2)
Corey Taylor – co-lead vocals (1) backing vocals (2 and 4)
Matthew Nelson – backing vocals (4, 5, 6 and 10)
Brett Anderson – backing vocals (4)
Joe Lester – backing vocals (3, 5, 6 and 10)
Rene Ruston – female voice (6)
Michael Lord – orchestration (3)

Release history

References

2009 debut albums
Steel Panther albums